John Jacobs (born July 3, 1959) is an American evangelist. He is the founder of the Power Team (which he ran for 27 years) and the Next Generation Power Force.

Like other ministries that Jacobs has been involved in, the Power Team and the Next Generation Power Force performs feats of strength in conjunction with their evangelism pursuits.

Jacobs had a guest role, in an episode of the television series Walker, Texas Ranger. The star of the show, Chuck Norris, is a friend of Jacobs.

In 2002, the Power Team filed for bankruptcy protection.

Personal life 
Jacobs lives in Greenville, North Carolina, and his present ministry is based in The Woodlands, Texas.

In May 2000, Jacobs divorced his wife Ruthanne.

Media 
John Jacobs & The Power Team – 1990 Frontline Records, 1 hour VHS video (V09085)
John Jacobs & The Power Team – 1990 Frontline Records, CD (CD09085) & Cassette (C09085)

References

External links 
Power Team Documentary

Living people
American evangelists
People from Cuyahoga Falls, Ohio
1959 births